Fernando Henrique Jungers Portugal (born São José dos Campos, 4 July 1981) is a former Brazilian rugby union player and a current coach. He played as a centre.

He first played for São José Rugby Clube, where first appeared in 1996/97, joining the first team in 1999/2000. He developed as a player at São José Rugby, being called for the Brazil for the U-20 category in 1999. He played then for the Rugby World Cup U-20. He won the Brazilian Rugby Championship three times, in 2002, 2003 and 2004. He moved to Segni in Italy, in 2005/06, where he played two years. He was one of the first Brazilian rugby union players to be able to perform in a professional level. He returned to São José Rugby in 2007/08, moving the following season to Bandeirantes Rugby Club, where he played until 2013. He won the Brazilian Rugby Championship in 2009. He returned to São José Rugby for the 2013 season.

He was a regular player for Brazil. He was also the captain of the Sevens national team. Portugal has a degree in P.E.

He was announced as the new head coach of Brazil in November 2019.

References

External links
 Fernando Portugal fala sobre seleção, volta às origens e muito mais, Portal do Rugby, 26 February 2013 (Portuguese)

1981 births
Living people
Brazilian rugby union players
Brazilian expatriate rugby union players
Brazilian rugby union coaches
Rugby union centres
Rugby sevens players at the 2015 Pan American Games
Pan American Games competitors for Brazil
Brazilian rugby sevens players
People from São José dos Campos
Sportspeople from São Paulo (state)
Brazil international rugby union players
Brazil national rugby union team coaches